The 2005 Preakness Stakes was the 130th running of the Preakness Stakes thoroughbred horse race. The race took place on May 21, 2005, and was televised in the United States on the NBC television network. Afleet Alex, who was jockeyed by Jeremy Rose, won the race by four and three quarter lengths over runner-up Scrappy T. Approximate post time was 6:21 p.m. Eastern Time. The race was run over a fast track in a final time of 1:55.04.  The Maryland Jockey Club reported total attendance of 125,687, this is recorded as second highest on the list of American thoroughbred racing top attended events for North America in 2005.

Race description
Scrappy T broke well and went to the early lead, then was overtaken by High Limit and Going Wild who set a reasonably fast pace. Afleet Alex settled behind the leaders, then started his move on the far turn, racing wide to pass other horses. Scrappy T retook the lead as they rounded into the stretch, but his jockey Ramon Domínguez looked back and saw that Afleet Alex was gaining ground on the outside. Dominguez swung the whip left-handed and Scrappy T swerved sharply away, directly into the path of Afleet Alex. The two horses clipped heels and Afleet Alex stumbled to his knees, his nose nearly touching the ground. "I thought for sure we were going down", said Jeremy Rose, the jockey of Afleet Alex. "The thought process was I was going to get run over. The instinct was just to hang on and try to get my balance back."

The crowd gasped, but Afleet Alex regained his balance and was quickly back into stride. Rose, a young jockey who was riding in the Preakness for the first time, was credited for skill in staying on, but gave the credit to Afleet Alex. "He was just that athletic, and I was just that scared", he said. Scrappy T had reopened his lead after the incident but Afleet Alex soon ran him down and pulled away to win by  lengths.

"Over 30 years, I've seen some horses take some bad steps in races and still win", said trainer Tim Ritchey. "I've never seen a horse stumble that badly and lose his momentum that much to come back on and win in a grade I race like this." Veteran sportswriter Steve Haskin wrote that it "remains arguably the single most athletic feat by a Thoroughbred seen in many years."

Payout 

The 130th Preakness Stakes Payout Schedule

 $2 Exacta: (12–5) paid $152.60
 $1 Trifecta: (12–5–13) paid $872.00
 $1 Superfecta: (12–5–13–10) paid $10,362.30

The full chart 

 Winning Breeder:  John Martin Silverland; (FL)  
 Final Time:  1:55.04
 Track Condition: Fast
 Total Attendance: 125,687

See also 

 2005 Kentucky Derby
 2005 Belmont Stakes

References

External links 
 

2005
2005 in horse racing
Horse races in Maryland
2005 in American sports
2005 in sports in Maryland